Micaela "Kai" Martinez DuCasse (1913–1989) was an American artist, author, and educator, known for her murals and sculptures. She was the daughter of Elsie Whitaker Martinez and painter Xavier Martínez. From 1955 to 1978 she taught at the  San Francisco College for Women.

Biography 
Micaela Martinez was born on August 26, 1913, in San Francisco, California, to Elsie Whitaker Martinez and painter Xavier Martinez. Although her father was born in Mexico, he never spoke Spanish at home and never taught her. She started drawing at the age of 3, studying with her father. At the age of 7 she expressed wanting to become a religious painter. Neither of her parents were particularly religious but she was sent to attend classes at the Catholic convent. At age 14 she enrolled in classes at California School of Arts and Crafts (now known as the California College of the Arts or CCA) in Oakland. At CCA she studied sculpture with Ralph Stackpole and showed natural talent.

From 1955 to 1978, she was a Lecturer and taught Liturgical Art classes at San Francisco College for Women at Lone Mountain. She also served as a Lecturer at Holy Names University (previously College of the Holy Names) in Oakland. She had been active in the Regional Oral History Office at the Bancroft Library, University of California, Berkeley.

Death

Micaela died May 5, 1989, in Oakland, California at the age of 75. She is survived by two daughters and three grandchildren. Funeral services were held at the Carmelite Monastery in Carmel. She was buried at St. Andrew's Priory at the Benedictine Monastery at Valyermo, in the Mojave Desert.

Personal life 
In 1944, she married artist Ralph DuCasse (1916–2003); however the marriage ended in divorce. Together they had two daughters, with their daughter Jeanne McCreary becoming an artist. She lived in her childhood home at 324 Scenic Avenue in Piedmont, California until her death, and this was also where she maintained her art studio.

Bibliography

References 

1913 births
1989 deaths
People from Piedmont, California
Artists from the San Francisco Bay Area
California College of the Arts alumni
Holy Names University